The 153rd Cavalry Brigade was a cavalry unit of the United States Army Organized Reserve during the interwar period. Organized in 1922, the brigade spent its entire career with the 62nd Cavalry Division and was disbanded after the United States entered World War II.

History 
The brigade was constituted in the Organized Reserve on 15 October 1921, part of the 62nd Cavalry Division in the Third Corps Area. It included the 305th and 306th Cavalry Regiments and the 153rd Machine Gun Squadron at Baltimore. In September 1922, the brigade headquarters was initiated (organized) at Baltimore. On 20 December 1928, the 153rd Machine Gun Squadron was relieved from its assignment to the 62nd and withdrawn from the Organized Reserves, with its personnel transferred to the 306th's new 3rd Squadron and Machine Gun Troop.

The brigade held its inactive training period meetings at the Post Office Building in Baltimore. Between 1923 and 1940, the 153rd usually conducted summer training at Fort Meade in Maryland, occasionally holding summer training with the 3rd Cavalry Regiment at Fort Myer or Fort Belvoir. Its subordinate regiments provided basic military instruction to civilians under the Citizens' Military Training Camp program at Fort Myer and Fort Belvoir with the assistance of the 3rd Cavalry as an alternate form of training. After the United States entered World War II, the brigade was disbanded on 30 January 1942 along with the division, after most of its officers were called up for active duty.

Commanders 
The brigade is known to have been commanded by the following officers:
 Colonel William M. Winter (September 1922–2 July 1924)
 Major James F. Tompkins (March 1925–October 1928)
 Major Edwin P. Rutan (June 1930–18 March 1931)
 Major Max Livingston Jr. (18 March 1931 – 13 June 1935)
 Major Henry P. Ames (13 June 1935 – 23 January 1938)
 Major Edwin P. Rutan (23 January–1 August 1938)
 Lieutenant Colonel Edward B. Harry (1 August 1938–August 1941)

References

Citations

Bibliography 
 

154
Military units and formations established in 1922
Military units and formations disestablished in 1942